Princess Junshi (珣子内親王; 1311 – 11 June 1337), or Shin-Muromachi-in (新室町院), was a Japanese princess and an empress consort (Chūgū) of Emperor Go-Daigo of Japan.

She was a princess of Japan as the daughter of Emperor Go-Fushimi of Japan and the Court Lady  Saionji (Fujiwara) Neishi. She married Emperor Go-Daigo, whose grandfather was her grandfather's paternal uncle.

Later on, she became known as Empress Dowager Shin-Muromachi-in.

Issue

 Imperial Princess Sachiko (幸子内親王) (1335–?)

Notes

Japanese empresses
Japanese princesses
1311 births
1337 deaths
Emperor Go-Daigo
History articles needing translation from Japanese Wikipedia